Vyacheslav Grigorevich Kurennoy (December 10, 1932 – December 23, 1992) was a Russian water polo player who competed for the Soviet Union in the 1956 Summer Olympics and in the 1960 Summer Olympics.

He was born in Moscow.

Career 
In 1956 he was a member of the Soviet team which won the bronze medal. He played all seven matches and scored three goals.

Four years later he won the silver medal with the Soviet team in the water polo competition at the 1960 Games. He played all seven matches and scored nine goals.

See also 
 List of Olympic medalists in water polo (men)

External links
 

1932 births
1992 deaths
Russian male water polo players
Soviet male water polo players
Olympic water polo players of the Soviet Union
Water polo players at the 1956 Summer Olympics
Water polo players at the 1960 Summer Olympics
Olympic silver medalists for the Soviet Union
Olympic bronze medalists for the Soviet Union
Olympic medalists in water polo
European Aquatics Championships medalists in swimming
Sportspeople from Moscow
Medalists at the 1960 Summer Olympics
Medalists at the 1956 Summer Olympics